Lake Norman High School is located in Mooresville, North Carolina. The school is a part of the Iredell-Statesville school system.  The name of the school comes from nearby Lake Norman. Lake Norman High School was built to relieve over-crowding at the nearby South Iredell High School. In 2009, Lake Norman High School had the highest graduation rate of North Carolina public non-charter schools with 95% of the senior class receiving a diploma. In June 2012, Lake Norman High School was recognized as a National Blue Ribbon Schools Program School of Excellence.

Size
As of August 2020, Lake Norman has over 1,885 students. The school was originally built for 1,300 students. In 2006, a new wing was added on to the school as the Freshmen Academy.

Athletics
The school has men's and women's teams in soccer, tennis, golf, basketball, swimming, diving, cross-country, track and field, and lacrosse.  Men's sports also include football, wrestling, and baseball (coached by former MLB player Ty Wigginton); women's sports also include volleyball, softball, and cheerleading.

The school has won state championships in Cheerleading (2002, 2003, 2004, 2005, 2006, 2017, 2019, 2020), women's lacrosse (2015), men's lacrosse (2012, 2018), men's soccer (2006 and 2007), men's tennis (2009), baseball (2009), men's basketball (2010), and men's swimming (2009). Individual state champions have been crowned in wrestling (2009, 2010, 2011, and 2013), women's tennis (2008), and men's and women's swimming (2009, 2010, 2011, and 2012). The school also claimed their first football conference championship in 2014 by sweeping the conference at 7–0.

The school competes in the I-Meck Conference which includes: Mooresville, Lake Norman, North Meck, Hough, Hopewell, Mallard Creek, Vance, And West Charlotte. Lake Norman's biggest rivals include Mooresville Senior High School and South Iredell.

Athletes from Lake Norman include swimmer Logan Heck, who achieved multiple Olympic cuts; swimmer Reed Wheeler, achieved an Olympic cut; Cuttaman 100gran in basketball; runner Michael Rupinski, and others. Numerous student-athletes have received college scholarships in a variety of sports.

Arts
Lake Norman High School has multiple art shows a year, chorus concerts, and drama plays.  All the different arts at the school have competitions where their art can be auditioned and moved on or perform in certain groups such as District Competitions and All State. The school supports the multi-discipline Spring Musical. LNHS has a competitive show choir, "Showformance".

Notable alumni
Tyler Ankrum, stock car racing driver
Nick Drake, stock car racing driver
Brandon Jones, stock car racing driver
Richie Steamboat, former professional wrestler

References

External links
Lake Norman High School website
Iredell-Statesville Schools website

Educational institutions established in 2002
Public high schools in North Carolina
Schools in Iredell County, North Carolina
2002 establishments in North Carolina